Steve Donahue (born May 21, 1962) is an American college basketball coach, currently the head coach of the Penn Quakers men's basketball team. He is the former head coach of Boston College and Cornell.

Background 

Donahue is a native of Springfield Township, Pennsylvania and a former player at Ursinus College.

Coaching career

Early jobs
Prior to becoming the head coach at Cornell University, Donahue began his coaching career as an assistant coach at Springfield High School, Monsignor Bonner High School, Philadelphia University, and The University of Pennsylvania.

Cornell
Donahue had been the head coach at Cornell from September 2000 until April 6, 2010. Cornell struggled early under Donahue, but he eventually turned the program around. A March 1, 2008 defeat of the Harvard Crimson gave Cornell the Ivy League championship for the first time since 1988 and just the second title in program history. On March 6, 2009, with Princeton's loss to Columbia, Cornell clinched the Ivy League Championship for a second consecutive year. It was the first time in 50 years that any team other than Penn or Princeton had won consecutive Ivy League titles in basketball.

Exactly one year later on March 6, 2010, Donahue's Cornell team defeated the Brown Bears to clinch its third consecutive title and fourth in team history. This guaranteed an automatic bid for Cornell in the 2010 NCAA basketball tournament, in which Cornell was given a 12-seed in the East region. Cornell went on to win two games in the tournament, defeating 5-seed Temple and then 4-seed Wisconsin, both victories by double digit margins, to advance to the Sweet 16, the first Ivy League team to advance this far since 1979 (when Penn reached the final four). There they fell to the 1-seed Kentucky Wildcats, ending their historic run. This team featured several lauded seniors, including point guard Louis Dale, who finished as the third highest scorer and top assist man in Cornell history; center Jeff Foote, whose presence in the middle was essential to Cornell's success; and forward Ryan Wittman, who finished as the top scorer in Cornell men's basketball history (and the 5th highest scorer overall in Ivy League's men's basketball history) at 2,028 points.

Donahue received the Clair Bee Coach of the Year Award for his accomplishments during the 2009–10 season.

Boston College 
On April 7, 2010, Boston College announced that Donahue had been hired as the head coach of its basketball program, replacing coach Al Skinner. Donahue led the Eagles to the second round of the NIT his first year. Donahue's second year was less successful, as the Eagles won only 9 games and lost to Harvard for the fourth year in a row. Donahue led the Eagles to a 16–17 season in his third year. Despite going 16–17, the Eagles lost to two top ten teams by one point.

On February 19, 2014, Donahue achieved what is considered his biggest win at BC by beating #1-ranked Syracuse on the road in the Carrier Dome, 62–59 in overtime. The upset was one of the few bright spots of Donahue's fourth and final year, which saw the Eagles finish with an 8–24 record.

On March 18, 2014, Boston College terminated Donahue. He compiled a 54–76 record in four seasons and failed to reach the NCAA tournament.

Penn
On March 16, 2015, Donahue was named the 20th head coach in Penn basketball history, replacing Jerome Allen. Donahue served as an assistant coach for the Quakers from 1990 to 2000. Following Donahue's hiring as head coach, Mike Krzyzewski, Duke University and USA National Team head coach, stated, "Steve Donahue is a terrific basketball coach, and is even more impressive off the court," adding, "This is truly an outstanding hire by the University of Pennsylvania." Penn's 2017–18 team won the 2018 Ivy League tournament qualifying for their 1st NCAA Tournament since 2007. As the 16th seed for the Midwest bracket of the 2018 NCAA tournament, they played number 1 seed Kansas. The Quakers jumped out to a 21–11 lead with 8:01 left in the 1st half. However, the Jayhawks finished the half on a 22–5 run taking a 33–26 lead into half-time. The Jayhawks never trailed again and outscored the Quakers 43–34 in the 2nd half, causing the Quakers to lose 60–76.

Head coaching record

References

External links
 Penn profile
 Cornell profile

1962 births
Living people
American men's basketball coaches
Basketball coaches from Pennsylvania
Basketball players from Pennsylvania
Boston College Eagles men's basketball coaches
College men's basketball head coaches in the United States
Cornell Big Red men's basketball coaches
High school basketball coaches in the United States
Penn Quakers men's basketball coaches
Philadelphia Rams men's basketball coaches
Ursinus Bears men's basketball players
Place of birth missing (living people)
American men's basketball players